Lithuanian cross crafting is a traditional Lithuanian art of crafting crosses. The making of altars and crosses is an important part of Lithuanian culture. Lithuanian traditional crosses are part of the people's Roman Catholic religion. Approximately since Lithuania became a part of the Russian Empire in the 19th century, these crosses have become a symbol of the Lithuanian people.

The crosses are intricately carved of oak wood, and sometimes incorporate iron elements as well. Their craftsmen, known as kryždirbiai, travel across the country. The most renowned Lithuanian cross crafter and god carver is the self-taught Vincas Svirskis (1835–1916), whose crosses, once seen across central Lithuania, are now kept in national museums.

The stylized crosses, Lietuviškasis kryžius, are put up along roadsides, in cemeteries, near houses and as votive offerings in churches. The crosses combine elements of architecture, sculpture, blacksmith art, and painting. One to five meters high, they often feature floral or geometric symbols, motifs of the sun, birds and the tree of life; they are sometimes adorned with small statues. To plead for grace or to express gratitude, the crosses are built as memorials to the dead or as the signs of spiritual protection at certain places. Even today crosses are built to mark the places of former settlements or farmsteads, places of death by homicide or accident, in memory of deceased people or groups of people, significant events and anniversaries, as protection for road travelers and adornment of sacred sites. The Hill of Crosses holds a large collection of the pieces.

Lithuanian cross crafting has been included in the list of Masterpieces of the Oral and Intangible Heritage of Humanity of 2001 by UNESCO.

Intricate cross crafting of wood, stone or metal, as well as elaborate jewelry crosses is known in other cultures as well. Examples are Celtic crosses, Ethiopian crosses and Armenian crosses.

See also
Dievdirbys, or "god carver"
Roofed pole

Footnotes

References
Cross-crafting. Lithuanian National Culture Centre.
Lithuania cross-makers keep tradition alive. Reuters.

Christianity in Lithuania
Cross crafting
Lithuanian folk art
Masterpieces of the Oral and Intangible Heritage of Humanity
National symbols of Lithuania
Woodcarving
Votive offering
Monumental crosses